is the mayor of Komae, Tokyo  in Japan. A member of the Japanese Communist Party, he was first elected in 1996.

References 
 

Mayors of places in Tokyo
People from Komae, Tokyo
1946 births
Living people
Japanese Communist Party politicians